Graceless is the debut album by British psychedelic rock/shoegaze band SULK, released on 15 April 2013 on Perfect Sound Forever.

Track listing
Sleeping Beauty
Flowers
Diamonds in Ashes
The Big Blue
Marian Shrine
Back in Bloom
Wishes
Down
If You Wonder
End Time

References

2013 debut albums
Sulk (British band) albums